Cusio is a comune (municipality) in the Province of Bergamo in the Italian region of Lombardy, and is located about  northeast of Milan and about  north of Bergamo.

Cusio borders the following municipalities: Cassiglio, Gerola Alta, Ornica, Santa Brigida.

Demographic evolution

References

External links
 www.cusio.info